The fourth season of Everybody Loves Raymond aired from September 20, 1999 to May 22, 2000

Production 

The fourth season of Everybody Loves Raymond was produced by HBO Independent Productions, creator Philip Rosenthal's company Where's Lunch, and David Letterman's Worldwide Pants. The episode "Marie and Frank's New Friends" was the final appearance of character actor David Byrd, who passed away at the age of 68 on February 2, 2001 due to cancer. Starting in the season, episodes of Raymond were produced in high definition.

Cast

Main 
Ray Romano as Raymond "Ray" Barone
Patricia Heaton as Debra (née Whelan) Barone
Brad Garrett as Robert Barone
Doris Roberts as Marie Barone
Peter Boyle as Francis "Frank" Barone
 Madylin Sweeten as Alexandra "Ally" Barone
Sawyer Sweeten as Geoffrey Barone 
 Sullivan Sweeten as Michael Barone

Supporting 
 Monica Horan as Amy McDougall
 Andy Kindler as Andy
 Jon Manfrellotti as Gianni 
 Tom McGowan as Bernie Gruenfelder
 Maggie Wheeler as Linda Gruenfelder 
 Katherine Helmond as Lois Whelan 
 Robert Culp as Warren Whelan
 Sherri Shepherd as Judy

 Victor Raider-Wexler as Stan
 Len Lesser as Garvin
 Charles Durning as Father Hubley
 Fred Stoller as Gerard
 Suzie Plakson as Joanne Glotz
 Ashley Crow as Jennifer Whelan
 David Hunt as Bill Parker
 David Byrd as Harry Stipe

Reception

Reviews 
During the 1999–2000 TV season, some critics claimed Everybody Loves Raymond to be one of the greatest sitcoms in an otherwise terrible season for the genre. Bruce Fretts of Entertainment Weekly, ranking Raymond the second-best series of 1999, claimed the cast "returned to full strength" in the season, and "no show has ever deserved its better-late-than-never ratings success more." Mitchell J. Near of Lawrence Journal-World called Marie and Frank "the best TV parents (from Hell)" of the 1999–2000 TV season, while Contra Costa Times ranked Raymond the second best show of the season. It was also on TV Guide's list of the best shows of 1999. Upon each episode's initial airing, Mike Hughes, a TV critic for Gannett News Service, included "Boob Job," "Sex Talk," "The Will," "Cousin Gerard," "Debra's Workout," "No Fat," "Left Back," "What's with Robert?," "Debra Makes Something Good," and "Confronting the Attacker" in his weekly feature of "Tonight's Must-See" programs. He called "Left Back" "a terrific episode, even by this show's high standards." Hal Boedeker gave a positive review of the season finale, labeling it "far more impressive than most ballyhooed sweeps programs." As he elaborated about the episode, "[Suzie] Plakson gives a memorably chilly performance, and the episode even manages a surprising cliffhanger."

Awards

Emmys 

On May 24, 2000, a truck of 9,600 videotapes, each containing four segments from season four of Raymond, was stolen from a North Hollywood parking lot; they were meant for voters of the Emmy Awards, and the robbery occurred a week before content submission to the Emmys was due. The tapes had been dubbed only hours before by a Technicolor company in Camarillo, California. Although this resulted in a delay, as HBO and Worldwide Pants had to re-produce the tapes, Rosenthal responded that he had no worries about Raymond not gaining Emmy nominations as a result. On June 21, the truck was spotted by a driver in a location five minutes away from the parking lot; 9,100 of the tapes were found in the truck, and CBS donated them to hospitals and nursing homes.

Everybody Loves Raymond's fourth season received nine Primetime Emmy Award nominations, including one Outstanding Comedy Series accolade for the season itself. Rosenthal and Romano were also nominated for Outstanding Writing for a Comedy Series for writing "Bad Moon Rising," Will MacKenzie was nominated for Outstanding Directing for a Comedy Series for his work on "The Christmas Picture," and Mike Berlin was nominated for Outstanding Cinematography for a Multi-Camera Series for "Robert's Rodeo." 

Five acting award nominations were for the lead performers. Romano was nominated for Outstanding Lead Actor in a Comedy Series; Heaton was nominated for Outstanding Lead Actress in a Comedy Series; Roberts was nominated for Outstanding Supporting Actress in a Comedy Series; and Garrett and Boyle were both nominated for Outstanding Supporting Actor in a Comedy Series. In the end, Heaton won the Lead Actress award, giving Everybody Loves Raymond its first-ever Emmy win. Analyzed Rosenthal, the public airing of Heaton's September 10, 2000 winning increased the popularity of Raymond's cast, which was a prominent factor of "Italy," an episode that aired a month later, garnering 22 million viewers, a record for the show.

Other 

For acting in the season, Romano was nominated for a Golden Globe Award for Best Actor in a Television Series Musical or Comedy; it was the first of only two nominations the series received throughout its nine-year run, as Romano would be nominated for the same award a year later. In what was Viewers for Quality Television's last Q award ceremony, the season was nominated for five awards, such as Best Supporting Actor in a Quality Comedy Series for Garrett, and won four: Best Quality Comedy Series, Best Actress in a Quality Comedy Series for Heaton, Best Actor in a Quality Comedy Series for Romano, and Best Supporting Actress in a Quality Comedy Series for Roberts. 

At the 16th TCA Awards, the season was nominated for Outstanding Achievement in Comedy, and Romano was nominated for Individual Achievement in Comedy. In regards to the fourth Online Film & Television Association TV Awards ceremony, Romano won Best Actor in a Comedy Series, Heaton was nominated for Best Actress in a Comedy Series, Boyle was nominated for Best Supporting Actor in a Comedy Series, the leads were nominated for Best Ensemble in a Comedy Series, and the season received a nomination for Best Comedy Series. The season garnered another Comedy Series Ensemble nomination at the sixth Screen Actors Guild Awards, an event where Romano was also nominated for Outstanding Performance by a Male Actor in a Comedy Series.

At the 2000 American Comedy Awards, Romano won Funniest Leading Male Performer in a TV Series, other nominations including Funniest Supporting Male Performer in a TV Series for Boyle, Funniest Supporting Female Performer in a TV Series for Roberts, and Funniest Television Series for the season. As an ASCAP composer, Rick Marotta received a Top Television Series award from the company's Film and Television Music Awards for his music on the latter half of season three and the first half of season four. The season also won Best Comedy Series awards from the American Cinema Foundation as an E Pluribus Unum award, the TV Guide Awards, and the Association of National Advertisers' Family Television Awards.

Episodes

References

1999 American television seasons
2000 American television seasons
Everybody Loves Raymond seasons